Oliver Frederick Ford (19 June 1925 – 17 October 1992) was an English interior designer. He served as decorator to the Queen Mother after receiving Royal Warrant in 1974. His other clients included the Duke of Marlborough at Blenheim, Mrs Harry Oppenheimer, Lord McAlpine of West Green and The Dorchester.

He served in the Royal Air Force during World War II as a volunteer reserve, initially in signals, then in air sea rescue. Ford attended Arts University Bournemouth where he studied the decorative arts. He headed the London office of Jansen Ltd, a French firm of decorators.

He appeared as a castaway on the BBC Radio programme Desert Island Discs on 5 March 1977.

The surviving firm at the time of Ford's death, Oliver Ford, included a subsidiary, Howard Chairs.

Bewley Court, the 14th-century home owned by Ford, has its own chapel and more than a dozen gardens; it is a Grade I listed building near Lacock in Wiltshire. As Ford left no heirs, Bewley Court was held by the Oliver Ford Charitable Trust, with proceeds donated to the mentally handicapped. By 1995 the Trust had ceased and was replaced by another registered charity, the Oliver Ford Foundation (also known as the Oliver Ford Will Trust) which in 2016 made donations to charities working in mental health and with children and young people, and made grants to students at the Victoria and Albert Museum, the Royal Horticultural Society and the Furniture History Society.

Ford was born in Bournemouth, Hampshire (now Dorset), and died at Lacock, Wiltshire.

Bibliography

References

1925 births
1992 deaths
English interior designers
Businesspeople from Bournemouth
Royal Air Force Volunteer Reserve personnel of World War II
Alumni of Arts University Bournemouth